This article is a list of diseases of crucifers (Brassica and Raphanus spp.).

Bacterial diseases

Fungal diseases

Miscellaneous diseases and disorders

Nematodes, parasitic

Viral diseases

References
Common Names of Diseases, The American Phytopathological Society
Crucifer Diseases (Fact Sheets and Information Bulletins), The Cornell Plant Pathology Vegetable Disease Web Page

Crucifer